Hans Much (1880–1932) was a German writer, and physician.

Sources
Whonamedit – Hans Much

External links
 
 

1880 births
1932 deaths
German male non-fiction writers
German medical writers